Barings LLC, known as Barings, is a global investment management firm owned by Massachusetts Mutual Life Insurance Company (MassMutual). It operates as a subsidiary of MassMutual Financial Group, a diversified financial services organization.

As of December 31, 2022, Barings held US$347+ billion in assets under management. Barings has over 1,800 professionals and offices in 16 countries.

Services 
Barings is a global investment manager sourcing differentiated opportunities and building long-term portfolios across public and private fixed income, real estate, and specialist equity markets. With investment professionals based in North America, Europe and Asia Pacific, the firm aims to serve its clients, communities and employees, and is committed to sustainable practices and responsible investment.

History 

Barings, originally established as a firm of merchants and merchant bankers, was formed in London in 1762.

In the 1950s, Barings realised the potential of asset management and set up its own investment department in 1955. Clients were corporate clients, sovereign connections, pension funds and charitable institutions. In the 1970s, Barings expanded this business internationally with offices in the Far East, North America and Europe.
In 1989, Barings combined all of its asset management activities within Baring Asset Management Limited, headquartered in London.
In 1995, Barings Bank, the oldest investment bank in Britain, collapsed as a result of unauthorised trading by its head derivatives trader in Singapore, Nick Leeson, who was imprisoned for six and a half years in Singapore. It was then bought for £1 by ING Group, a Dutch bank.

In March 2005, Baring Asset Management was split and Massachusetts Mutual Life Insurance Company (MassMutual) acquired Baring Asset Management's investment management activities and the rights to use the Baring Asset Management name. Northern Trust acquired Baring Asset Management’s Financial Services Group.

In September 2016, MassMutual merged Babson Capital Management, Wood Creek Capital Management, Cornerstone Real Estate Advisers, and Baring Asset Management to form Barings.

Recent notable events 

2010 – Baring Asset Management wins the Queen’s Award for Enterprise 2010 in the International Trade Category

2012 – 250th Anniversary

2013 – Baring Asset Management completes acquisition of SEI Asset Korea Co., Ltd (SEIAK)

2016 – Barings is formed after MassMutual merges Babson Capital Management, Wood Creek Capital Management, Cornerstone Real Estate Advisers and Baring Asset Management.

2018 - Barings Acquires Triangle Capital Corporation (Renamed Barings BDC INC.)

2020 - Barings BDC Closes Merger with MVC Capital

2021 - Barings BDC closes merger with Sierra Income Corporation

2022 - Barings Acquires Altis Property Partners

References

Further reading 

 Philip Ziegler, The Sixth Great Power: Barings 1762-1929 (1988). London: HarperCollins Publishers Limited. .
 John Orbell (1995), Baring Brothers & Co., Limited: a history to 1939. London: Baring Brothers & Company

External links 

Official Website
The Baring Archive

Financial services companies based in the City of London
Financial services companies established in 1989
Investment management companies of the United Kingdom
Baring family